Chao Ong Long (also spelled Ong Lông; ; died 1760) was the king of Vientiane from 1735 to 1760.

Ong Long was the eldest son of Setthathirath II (Sai Ong Hue), other source stated that he was a half-brother of Sai Ong Hue. He succeeded Sai Ong Hue in 1730. Little is known about his reign. He died in 1760 or 1767, succeeded by his son (or younger brother) Siribunnyasan (Ong Boun).

References

1760 deaths
Kings of Vientiane
People from Vientiane
18th-century Laotian people